Frisz is a pop group based in the Netherlands. The group was previously (2004-2015) known as Djumbo.

The three girls met in a dancing school in Eindhoven, where their dancing skills were discovered by a record producer who signed them up for their first single "Hide and Seek" under the Djumbo Project.

The lyrics of most Djumbo songs are written in a combination of English and Dutch, with the majority of a song being in Dutch and the chorus (and title) being in English.

New line-up
Svenja decided to leave Djumbo. She said: "After 7 beautiful years with Djumbo, I wanna grow further." She was replaced by Samantha Klumper.

Side-projects
In 2009-2010 Djumbo hosted the pop and showbizz game show Kies je ster (Pick your star) for broadcast on TROS. The format was a spinoff from the classic Ren je rot (1973-1983), itself being the Dutch version of Runaround.

Frisz

In 2015, following Lotte Prijs's departure, Djumbo held a new round of auditions, selecting Danique van Rosmalen as their new member. It was also announced Djumbo would change their name to Frisz moving forward.

In 2017, they returned with their new single "Rainbow In The Sky", their first new single under their new name.

Since early 2018, however, Frisz has gone silent on social media with members moving on to other careers. It's presumed that Frisz silently disbanded.

Members

Note: those in bold are current members.

Discography

Albums

References

External links
 Official website, archived
 Official Hyves
Djumbo biography, news, discography at Bubblegum Dancer

Musical groups from Eindhoven
Dutch girl groups
Musical groups established in 2004